Daniel Niell Jordaan (born 13 January 1992) is a South African professional rugby union player for  in the Currie Cup and the Rugby Challenge. His regular position is number eight.

Career

Schools rugby

Jordaan earned a provincial call-up as early as primary school level, representing the Pumas at the 2005 Under-13 Craven Week competition. He was once again called up in 2008, playing for them at the Under-16 Grant Khomo week, which earned him an inclusion in the South African Under-16 Elite Squad.

Jordaan moved to Bloemfontein in 2009 to finish his schooling at Grey College. He represented the Free State at the premier high school rugby union competition, the Under-18 Craven Week, on two occasions; at the 2009 event in East London and at the 2010 event in Welkom, where Free State beat Western Province 42–21 in the main match of the competition. Jordaan was subsequently included in a South African Under-18 High Performance Squad, which played matches against France, England and Namibia.

Free State Cheetahs / UFS Shimlas / Griffons

After finishing high school, Jordaan joined the Free State Academy and appeared for the  side in the 2011 Under-19 Provincial Championship, where he made seven appearances as his side reached the semi-finals of the competition. He progressed to the  squad in 2012 and started all thirteen of their matches during the 2012 Under-21 Provincial Championship, scoring three tries as his side once again reached the semi-finals.

He returned to action for the  side during the 2013 Under-21 Provincial Championship, making seven starts.

Jordaan played seven times for the  during the 2014 Varsity Cup competition, scoring a try against  and a brace against  a week later.

Jordaan started all nine of the ' matches during the 2015 Varsity Cup competition. He scored three tries during the round-robin stage of the competition to help Shimlas finish top of the log and qualify for a home semi-final. He opened the scoring in their semi-final match against two-time champions  by scoring a 10th-minute try in a 21–10 victory to help them qualify for their first ever final.

Cheetahs

References

1992 births
Living people
Cheetahs (rugby union) players
Free State Cheetahs players
Griffons (rugby union) players
Griquas (rugby union) players
Rugby union flankers
Rugby union number eights
Rugby union players from Newcastle, KwaZulu-Natal
South African rugby union players